Wojciech Władysław Rudy (born 24 October 1952 in Katowice) is a retired Polish football player. He played mostly for Zagłębie Sosnowiec.

He played for the Poland national team (40 matches/1 goal) and was a participant at the 1978 FIFA World Cup, and also at the 1976 Summer Olympics, where Poland won the silver medal.

References

1952 births
Living people
Polish footballers
Poland international footballers
1978 FIFA World Cup players
Sportspeople from Katowice
Olympic footballers of Poland
Olympic silver medalists for Poland
Footballers at the 1976 Summer Olympics
Medalists at the 1976 Summer Olympics
Olympic medalists in football
Association football midfielders
Kuopion Palloseura players
Zagłębie Sosnowiec players